NGC 3198, also known as Herschel 146 is a barred spiral galaxy in the constellation Ursa Major. It was discovered by William Parsons, 3rd Earl of Rosse (Lord Rosse), sometime before 1850. NGC 3198 is located in the Leo Spur, which is part of the Virgo Supercluster, and is approximately 47 million light years away.

NGC 3198 was one of 18 galaxies targeted by the Hubble Space Telescope (HST) Key Project on the Extragalactic Distance Scale, which aimed to calibrate various secondary distance indicators and determine the Hubble constant to an accuracy of 10%. The type and orientation of NGC 3198 made it suitable for these measurements. The Wide Field and Planetary Camera 2 (WFPC2) of the HST was used to measure the magnitudes of 52 Cepheid variables, and the resulting distance modulus corresponded to a distance of 14.5 Mpc (47 million light years).

Observations made with the Westerbork Synthesis Radio Telescope detected for the first time the presence of extraplanar gas. The extraplanar gas makes up approximately 15% of the total atomic hydrogen (HI) mass of the galaxy.

Two supernovae have been discovered in NGC 3198: SN 1966J, a Type Ib supernova, and 1999bw, which was significantly fainter than expected when first discovered, and has been classified a Type IIn supernova.

Gallery

References

External links
 

Barred spiral galaxies
3198
Ursa Major (constellation)
17880115
030197